The Public Eye Magazine is published by Political Research Associates in Somerville, Massachusetts. The magazine was founded in 1977 by the Public Eye Network. It currently contains investigative articles about "movements, institutions, and ideologies that undermine human rights." Its primary focus is on right-wing groups in the United States.

Editors 

The original editors of the Public Eye Magazine were Harvey Kahn and Mark Ryter. The magazine was a publication of The Repression Information Project, a non-profit research center focusing on repression in the US, staffed by Russ Bellant, Susan Gluss, Eda Gordon, Harvey Kahn, and Mark Ryter.

References

Further reading
Nicholson, Judith. “The Public Eye.” Afterimage, Vol. 22, February 1995, p. 23.

External links
Official webpage
The Public Eye archive

Alternative press
News magazines published in the United States
Magazines established in 1977
Magazines published in Massachusetts